Edith Hauer-Frischmuth (1913 in Vienna – 2004 in Altaussee) was an Austrian woman, named one of the Righteous Among the Nations.
 
She saved her Jewish friend, Monika Taylor, from being arrested by the Gestapo in 1942.  In the Austrian resistance she supplied Jews with fake documents and helped them to get out of the country.  At the end of the war she also worked for the British Army, for which she received an award.

External links 
Edith Hauer – her activity to save Jews' lives during the Holocaust, at Yad Vashem website
Israel honors 2 Austrians (Edith Hauer and Franz Leitner) *German*

1913 births
2004 deaths
Austrian Righteous Among the Nations
People from Vienna
Austrian resistance members
Female resistance members of World War II